Thomas P. Costin Jr. (born 1926) was a Massachusetts politician who served as the 45th Mayor of Lynn, Massachusetts.

Costin served eight years on the Lynn City Council before being elected mayor in 1956. At the age of 29, he became the youngest mayor in Lynn's history.

As mayor, he proposed and spearheaded an urban renewal plan which targeted the Brickyard neighborhood of Lynn in an effort to make the city more attractive to industry and give it the ability to compete with surrounding communities' shopping malls but the program ultimately failed to deliver on its promises.

A close friend of John F. Kennedy, Costin lead the voter registration drive during Kennedy's 1958 Senate Reelection campaign.  Costin was a Kennedy delegate to the 1960 Democratic National Conventions.   Costin was appointed Lynn District postmaster by the President in 1961. He served as Postmaster until 1992. He was reportedly a finalist for the position of United States Postmaster General in 1976. In late 2018, the Post Office building in which Costin served as postmaster was renamed in his honor by an Act of Congress. The official dedication ceremony was held on May 24, 2019.

Notes

Massachusetts city council members
Mayors of Lynn, Massachusetts
Massachusetts postmasters
1926 births
Living people
Massachusetts Democrats
United States Marine Corps personnel of World War II